Truncatellina callicratis is a species of very small air-breathing land snail, a terrestrial pulmonate gastropod mollusk in the family Truncatellinidae.

Distribution 
This species is known to occur in a number of countries and islands including:
 Great Britain, (rare in the south)
 Albania
 Italy
 Pakistan
 and other areas

References

External links 
 
 
 

Truncatellinidae
Gastropods described in 1833
Molluscs of Pakistan